Men's kabaddi at the 2010 Asian Games was held in Nansha Gymnasium, Guangzhou, China from 22 to 26 November 2010.

Squads

Results
All times are China Standard Time (UTC+08:00)

Preliminary round

Group A

Group B

Knockout round

Semifinals

Final

Final standing

References

Results

External links
Official website

Men